Qasemabad (also Romanized as Qāsemābād; also known as Qāsemābād-e Sāqū’īyeh and Qāsemābād Sāqū’īyeh) is a village in Tujerdi Rural District, Sarchehan District, Bavanat County, Fars Province, Iran. At the 2006 census, its population was 460, in 109 families.

References 

Populated places in Sarchehan County